Hot Springs (Lakota: mni kȟáta; "hot water") is a city in and county seat of Fall River County, South Dakota, United States. As of the 2020 census, the city population was 3,395. In addition, neighboring Oglala Lakota County contracts the duties of Auditor, Treasurer and Register of Deeds to the Fall River County authority in Hot Springs.

Geography
The Fall River runs through the city.

Hot Springs has been assigned the ZIP code 57747 and the FIPS place code 30220.

History
The Sioux and Cheyenne people had long frequented the area, appreciating its warm springs. According to several accounts, including a ledger art piece by the Oglala Lakota artist Amos Bad Heart Bull, Native Americans considered the springs sacred.
European settlers arrived in the second half of the 19th century. They first named the city "Minnekahta" after its Lakota name. It was renamed Hot Springs in 1882, which is a translation of the Native American name. A variety of health resorts were built on the tourism offered by the springs.

Tourism

Some of the attractions in the Hot Springs area are The Mammoth Site and Evans Plunge, built in 1890, with its naturally warm  spring water. The town is also a gateway to the attractions of the southern Black Hills, particularly Wind Cave National Park. Hot Springs holds the annual Miss South Dakota pageant. In recognition of its historic value, the National Trust for Historic Preservation listed Hot Springs as one of its 2009 Dozen Distinctive Destinations. The city center contains over 35 sandstone buildings.

The Angostura Reservoir, a 4,407 acres (17.83 km2) lake is located 10 miles southeast of the city and is a popular fishing, camping, and recreation area. Cold Brook Dam, which creates Cold Brook Lake is a 36-acre lake is located just north of the city, and Cottonwood Springs Dam and lake is located about 5 miles west.

Hot Springs is also the home of a United States Department of Veterans Affairs hospital (Black Hills Healthcare System - Hot Springs Campus), which was designated in 2011 as a National Historic Landmark. Formerly known as the Battle Mountain Sanitarium, the 100-bed center was built in 1907 for patients with rheumatism or tuberculosis. In the early 21st century, it offers extensive outpatient treatment, acute hospital care, PTSD treatment, and an alcohol and drug treatment facility. The Battle Mountain Sanitarium was declared a National Treasure by the National Trust for Historic Preservation following a December 2011 proposal announced by the Department of Veterans Affairs to close the facility. Community and state leaders, including Senator Tim Johnson, Senator John Thune, and Representative Kristi Noem opposed the closing. A concerned group of veterans and citizens organized a "Save the VA" Campaign; they have countered the VA's proposal based on the results of multiple Freedom of Information Act requests, getting as far as meeting with Secretary of Veterans Affairs Eric Shinseki to show how they believe VA leadership manipulated data to justify the proposed closure of the Landmark. After the Veterans Health Administration scandal of 2014, Hot Springs was visited by members of the United States House Committee on Veterans' Affairs for a Congressional field hearing regarding the proposed closure and the committee heard testimony from members of the Save the VA Committee and others opposed to the closure, as well as two VA administrators in favor of the closure.

Climate

Hot Springs has a cool semi-arid climate (Köppen BSk) bordering on a humid continental climate (Dfa/Dwa). During the three winter months from December to February, twenty-five afternoons can be expected to exceed  and five winter afternoons will climb to  due to these warm winds. Nonetheless, extreme cold occurs frequently during the winter when the Föhn effect is absent: the average window for minima below or reaching  is from December 3 to February 27, and fifteen mornings get this cold during an average winter, with  reached twice per winter on average. Thirty afternoons each winter stay below , with all but seven in the severe month of January 1937 not topping the freezing point.

Snowfall averages  – vastly less than the extremely snowy high parts of the Black Hills – due to the very dry winters and relatively warm temperatures.

Spring warms up early: the first afternoon climbing to  can be expected as early as March 22, and the first  maximum as early as April 22. Spring is usually the wettest season, especially in its later stages, due to occasionally very heavy thunderstorm rains.

Summers are generally hot, at times uncomfortably so, although mornings tend to be fairly comfortable. On average, only two mornings each year will stay above , with only three mornings on record remaining at or above , although five afternoons each summer top  and forty afternoons will top . The fall season is usually dry and sees increasingly variable temperatures: the first freeze can be expected as early as September 23, but maxima in the eighties Fahrenheit have occurred as late as November 8 (in 1999).

Demographics

2010 census
As of the census of 2010, there were 3,711 people, 1,730 households, and 910 families residing in the city. The racial makeup of the city was 85.4% White, 1.1% African American, 9.3% Native American, 0.5% Asian, 0.1% Pacific Islander, 0.2% from other races, and 3.5% from two or more races. Hispanic or Latino of any race were 2.1% of the population.

There were 1,730 households, of which 21.0% had children under the age of 18 living with them, 38.4% were married couples living together, 11.0% had a female householder with no husband present, 3.2% had a male householder with no wife present, and 47.4% were non-families. 42.9% of all households were made up of individuals, and 20.3% had someone living alone who was 65 years of age or older. The average household size was 2.03 and the average family size was 2.79.

The median age in the city was 49.8 years. 19.1% of residents were under the age of 18; 5.6% were between the ages of 18 and 24; 18.8% were from 25 to 44; 32.9% were from 45 to 64; and 23.7% were 65 years of age or older. The gender makeup of the city was 50.4% male and 49.6% female.

2000 census
As of the census of 2000, there were 4,129 people, 1,704 households, and 962 families residing in the city. The population density was 1,417.3 people per square mile (547.8/km2). There were 1,900 housing units at an average density of 652.2 per square mile (252.1/km2). The racial makeup of the city was 88.06% White, 0.39% African American, 7.82% Native American, 0.36% Asian, 0.05% Pacific Islander, 0.19% from other races, and 3.12% from two or more races. Hispanic or Latino of any race were 1.91% of the population.
There were 1,704 households, out of which 23.5% had children under the age of 18 living with them, 42.0% were married couples living together, 10.8% had a female householder with no husband present, and 43.5% were non-families. 39.8% of all households were made up of individuals, and 17.4% had someone living alone who was 65 years of age or older. The average household size was 2.16 and the average family size was 2.88.

In the city, the population was spread out, with 24.0% under the age of 18, 6.7% from 18 to 24, 19.4% from 25 to 44, 25.7% from 45 to 64, and 24.2% who were 65 years of age or older. The median age was 45 years. For every 100 females, there were 113.3 males. For every 100 females age 18 and over, there were 106.7 males.

As of 2000 the median income for a household in the city was $27,079, and the median income for a family was $35,786. Males had a median income of $28,750 versus $18,333 for females. The per capita income for the city was $16,618. About 8.1% of families and 14.8% of the population were below the poverty line, including 20.9% of those under age 18 and 12.4% of those age 65 or over.

Notable people

 Albert R. Anderson, U.S. Representative, mayor of Lead, and lawyer
 Joseph Bottum, writer
 Dan Dryden, educator and politician
 Charles S. Eastman, attorney and member of the South Dakota House of Representatives
 Jarrod Emick, musical theatre actor
 Orlando Ferguson, proponent of the Flat Earth Theory
 Charles Hargens, painter
 Leslie Jensen, 15th Governor of South Dakota
 Jacqueline Left Hand Bull, Continental Counselor and Chair of the National Spiritual Assembly of the Bahá'ís of the United States
 Jess Thomas, American operatic tenor

See also
 List of cities in South Dakota

References

External links

 Hot Springs Chamber of Commerce

Cities in South Dakota
Cities in Fall River County, South Dakota
Hot springs of South Dakota
County seats in South Dakota
Black Hills
Bodies of water of Fall River County, South Dakota